Anatoly Kashirov (born May 19, 1987) is a Russian professional basketball player who last played for Dzūkija Alytus of the Lithuanian Basketball League.

References

External links
CSKA Moscow player profile
 Mitteldeutscher BC player profile

1987 births
Living people
Aris B.C. players
BC Khimki players
BC Spartak Saint Petersburg players
BK Ventspils players
Centers (basketball)
Greek Basket League players
PBC CSKA Moscow players
Russian men's basketball players
Basketball players from Moscow
Tigers Tübingen players
Universiade medalists in basketball
Universiade silver medalists for Russia
Medalists at the 2009 Summer Universiade